is a Japanese manga series written and illustrated by Syundei. The series follows the titular Nakamura, a closeted high school student who has a secret crush on his classmate. Go For It, Nakamura! was serialized in the manga magazine Opera from 2014 to 2016, collected into a bound volume by Akane Shinsha in 2017, and licensed for an English-language release by Seven Seas Entertainment in 2018. A sequel, began serialization in June 2017.

Synopsis
Closeted sixteen-year-old high school student Okuto Nakamura harbors a crush on his classmate Aiki Hirose, despite having never actually spoken to him. The strongly introverted Nakamura fantasizes about speaking to Hirose and often attempts to integrate himself into scenarios that would allow the two to interact, though the majority end in comedic failure. Nakamura is eventually able to build his confidence and grow closer to Hirose. The series concludes with the two boys developing a reciprocal friendship.

Characters
  
  (audio drama) 
 A closeted high school student. He has a crush on his classmate Aiki Hirose, but is acutely introverted and has never spoken to him.

  
  (audio drama) 
 Nakamura's classmate, and his unrequited love interest.

  
  (audio drama) 
 Nakamura's homeroom teacher.

  
  (audio drama) 
 Nakamura's classmate. A talented artist.

  
  (audio drama) 
 Hirose's childhood friend.

  
  (audio drama) 
 A member of the drama club.

Media

Manga
The character Nakamura first appeared in illustrations and short web comics posted by Syundei online. In 2014, Syundei was approached by the managing editor of the manga magazine Opera to draw a comic to fill empty pages in an issue of the magazine. That comic, a one shot that was published in the December 2014 issue of Opera, would become the first chapter of Go For It, Nakamura!. Beginning in the June 2015 issue of Opera, Go For It, Nakamura! began serialization as a regular series, running concurrently in Opera with Syundei's horror manga series Total Eclipse of the Eternal Heart.

Upon its conclusion, the eleven-chapter series was collected into a bound volume by Akane Shinsha and published on May 27, 2017. On September 15, 2017, Seven Seas Entertainment announced that it would license an English-language translation of the series. The single-volume manga was published on July 3, 2018, making Go For It, Nakamura! the first boys' love manga series to be published by Seven Seas.

A sequel series, began serialization in Opera in June 2017. An English-language translation was published by Seven Seas Entertainment in July 2022.

|}

Other media
An audio drama adaptation of Go For It, Nakamura! was published on September 8, 2021. The adaptation features Kappei Yamaguchi as the voice of Nakamura, Junko Takeuchi as the voice of Hirose, and Tomoyuki Morikawa as the narrator, with original music by OdiakeS. A 12-page exclusive special chapter of the manga series was released with it.

Characters from Go For It, Nakamura! were included in a pop-up cafe run by Opera in Harajuku, Tokyo from March 16 to April 8, 2018. The cafe featured original merchandise and menu items inspired by the series.

Reception
Go For It, Nakamura! was positively received by critics. The series was praised for its 1980s-reminiscent artwork, with Sean Gaffney of Manga Bookshelf favorably comparing it to Ranma ½ and Kimagure Orange Road. Anthony Gramuglia noted in his review of the series for Anime Feminist that Go For It, Nakamura! is "part of a new wave of [boys' love] manga that are more about identity than sex." Reviewing the series for Otaku USA, Brittany Vincent praised the series' romantic comedy elements, calling Go For It, Nakamura! a "special treat for LGBT audiences eager for a sweet, retro-flavored romantic comedy."

At the 2018 BL Awards presented by Chill Chill, Go For It, Nakamura! ranked 16th in the rankings of the best boys' love bound volumes released in 2017.

References

External links
 

2014 manga
2017 manga
Akane Shinsha manga
LGBT in anime and manga
Comedy anime and manga
Seven Seas Entertainment titles
Yaoi anime and manga
School life in anime and manga